Youth to Youth is a 1922 American silent melodrama film directed by Emile Chautard and starring Billie Dove, Edythe Chapman, and Hardee Kirkland. It was released on October 16, 1922.

Cast
 Billie Dove as Eve Allinson
 Edythe Chapman as Mrs. Cora Knittson
 Hardee Kirkland as Taylor
 Sylvia Ashton as Mrs. Jolley
 Jack Gardner as Maurice Gibbon
 Cullen Landis as Page Brookins
 Mabel Van Buren as Mrs. Brookins
 Tom O'Brien as Ralph Horry
 Paul Jeffrey as Everett Clough
 Carl Gerard as Howe Snedecor

Preservation
The film is now considered lost.

Gallery

References

1922 films
1922 drama films
Silent American drama films
American silent feature films
American black-and-white films
Lost American films
Metro Pictures films
Melodrama films
1922 lost films
Lost drama films
1920s English-language films
1920s American films